Citharomangelia pellucida is a species of sea snail, a marine gastropod mollusk in the family Mangeliidae.

Description
The ovate shell is attenuated at both ends, smooth, transparent, shining, longitudinally closely ribbed. The color of the shell is whitish, brown at the
base, sometimes with three narrow, interrupted bands.

Distribution
This marine species occurs off Madagascar, the Philippines and off Queensland, Australia.

References

 Reeve, L.A. 1846. Monograph of the genus Mangelia. pls 1–8 in Reeve, L.A. (ed). Conchologia Iconica. London : L. Reeve & Co. Vol. 3. 
 Hedley, C. 1922. A revision of the Australian Turridae. Records of the Australian Museum 13(6): 213–359, pls 42-56
 Dautzenberg, Ph. (1929). Mollusques testacés marins de Madagascar. Faune des Colonies Francaises, Tome III 
 Kilburn R.N. 1992. Turridae (Mollusca: Gastropoda) of southern Africa and Mozambique. Part 6. Subfamily Mangeliinae, section 1. Annals of the Natal Museum, 33: 461–575.

External links
  Tucker, J.K. 2004 Catalog of recent and fossil turrids (Mollusca: Gastropoda). Zootaxa 682:1-1295.

pellucida
Gastropods described in 1846